Penwithick and Boscoppa is an electoral division of Cornwall in the United Kingdom and returns one member to sit on Cornwall Council. The current Councillor is Matthew Luke, a member of Mebyon Kernow, a Cornish nationalist party.

Councillors

2013-2021

2021-present

Extent

2013-2021
Under its former boundaries, Penwithick and Boscoppa represented the very north of St Austell including Carclaze and Boscoppa (though a small part of Boscoppa was covered by the St Austell Poltair division). The division also represented the villages of Trethurgy, Rescorla and Penwithick and the hamlets of Scredda and Carluddon. In total, it covered 881 hectares.

2021-present
With its current boundaries, the division represents the very north of the town of St Austell, including Carclaze and Boscoppa (with a small part of Boscoppa now being covered by the St Austell Poltair and Mount Charles division), the villages of Trethurgy, Rescorla, Penwithick and Stenalees, and the hamlets of Scredda, Carluddon, Trethowel, Ruddlemoor and Carthew.

Election results

2021 election

2017 election

2013 election

Notes

References

Electoral divisions of Cornwall Council
St Austell